Live at the Fillmore East is a live album by Neil Young and Crazy Horse featuring guitarist Danny Whitten, released in 2006. It also has the distinction of being the first album released as part of the Neil Young Archives series of archival recordings.

Overview
In February and March 1970, Young and Crazy Horse went on tour to support Everybody Knows This Is Nowhere (1969). Live at the Fillmore East features performances from the tour. The tour was the last Neil Young and Crazy Horse tour to feature Whitten.

Young played four shows at the Fillmore East on March 6 and 7, each show consisting of a solo acoustic set and an electric set with Crazy Horse. This release contains each song performed during the electric set, minus "Cinnamon Girl" (which was eventually released as a BD-Live download as part of The Archives Vol. 1 1963–1972 box set). It was released on CD and DVD. The DVD features pictures from the show, pictures of the original handwritten lyrics and reviews from the era, as well as improved sound (24bit/96 kHz PCM audio) over the CD release.

The album is the first live release featuring Danny Whitten, who died in 1972. It also features Jack Nitzsche as an official member of the band, as indicated by Young in the band introductions; this four-man line-up of Crazy Horse backed Young for a short American tour in February and March 1970. A performance of Whitten's "Come On Baby Let's Go Downtown" from the same shows was previously released on Young's 1975 album Tonight's the Night, which explores Young's grief at the loss of friends to drugs. A studio version of this song appears on the album Crazy Horse. While the song is credited to Young and Whitten both on that album and on Tonight's the Night, here "Downtown" is credited to Whitten alone. (At the very end of the final track, "Cowgirl in the Sand", one can hear the studio version of James Taylor's "Sweet Baby James" being played.)

The release features two other songs from the era that wouldn't see the light of day until years after the concert. "Winterlong" was first released on the 1977 compilation Decade and "Wonderin'" would feature on the 1983 rockabilly album Everybody's Rockin', complete with doo-wop backing vocals.

It is the first release related to the Neil Young Archives|Archives series, but labeled the second. (However, two earlier concerts have since been released, Sugar Mountain - Live at Canterbury House 1968 which was released on November 25, 2008 and Live at the Riverboat 1969, from a 1969 Young residency at the Toronto coffee house of the same name, which was released on June 2, 2009.)

The release is a departure of format from what fans had expected. In previous interviews, Young had expressed interest in releasing a series of multi-disc box sets of unreleased material and performances, long referred to as the "Archives". Later, another installment, Live at Massey Hall 1971 was released and fared better on the charts. The release date of the first of the box sets Young discussed, The Archives Vol. 1 1963-1972, was announced in March 2007  for release in September or October of that year. Soon after those months passed without the box set, a new release date was announced - February 2008 - which also passed without further Archive releases. Finally on June 2, 2009 the Archives were released with Live at Fillmore East comprising disc 5 of the 8-disc CD release.

The album debuted on the Billboard 200 album chart at number 55 on December 2, 2006, with sales of 20,000 copies. It spent three weeks on the chart.

There is also a 200-gram vinyl LP pressing by Classic Records. Though originally planned to include a bonus performance of "Cinnamon Girl" as a bonus track, the final product has the same track listing as the CD and DVD. "Cinnamon Girl" is separately available online.

The support act for this performance was Miles Davis performing with an electric sextet. Davis' performance has also been released as the live album Live at the Fillmore East, March 7, 1970: It's About that Time.

Track listing 

All tracks written by Neil Young except as indicated.

 "Everybody Knows This Is Nowhere" – 3:36
 "Winterlong" – 3:40
 "Down by the River" – 12:24
 "Wonderin'" – 3:35
 "Come on Baby Let's Go Downtown" (Danny Whitten, Neil Young) – 3:51
 "Cowgirl in the Sand" – 16:09

Personnel 
 Neil Young - guitar, vocals
Crazy Horse
 Danny Whitten - guitar, vocals
 Billy Talbot - bass
 Ralph Molina - drums, backing vocals
 Jack Nitzsche - electric piano

Production
Fillmore East Recording
Producer: Paul Rothchild
Engineer: Peter K. Siegel

Audio Post-Production 
Analog to Digital Transfers: John Nowland at Redwood Digital
Mixed and Mastered at Redwood Digital
Mastered by Tim Mulligan
All Songs* Mixed by: John Nowland with Neil Young (except “Cowgirl In The Sand” Mixed by: Peter K. Siegel)
Assisting Engineer:  John Hausmann

DVD Production
Directed by Bernard Shakey
Produced by L.A. Johnson
Executive Producer:  Elliot Rabinowitz
Associate Producer: Will Mitchell
Director of Photography:  Benjamin Johnson
Edited by Toshi Onuki
Archivist: Joel Bernstein
Post Production at Total Media Group
Production Coordinator:  Paul Supplee
DVD Art Direction: Toshi Onuki
DVD Main Title by Steven Gregory, Canal Street Studios,
DVD Menu Sound Design: Hands on Sound
DVD Authoring: Rich Winter
Graphics Production: Ziemowit “Jim” Darski, Beca Lafore, John Fadeff, Megan McKenna 
Production Assistant: Topher White
Grip: Joe Mendoza, Todd Stoneman
Photos: Joel Bernstein, Amalie R. Rothschild, Joe Sia (courtesy of Wolfgang’s Vault), Al Kramer
Fillmore East Memorabilia: Courtesy of Jack Weston

Notes

External links 
 Neil Young official site Fillmore East page featuring audio clips and a trailer
 Rolling Stone review with audio stream of album

Live at the Fillmore East albums
Albums produced by Paul A. Rothchild
Neil Young live albums
2006 live albums
Reprise Records live albums
Live hard rock albums
Hard rock video albums
2006 video albums
Live video albums
Reprise Records video albums
Crazy Horse (band) albums